Nikola Sekulov (born 18 February 2002) is a professional footballer who plays as a midfielder for  club Juventus Next Gen. Born in Italy to Macedonian parents, Sekulov represented Macedonia internationally at youth level, before switching to Italy in 2018.

Club career 
Born in Piacenza, Italy, to Macedonian parents, Sekulov began his youth career at Piacenza in 2007, remaining there until 2012 when he moved to Parma. In 2015 he joined Pro Piacenza, before moving to Juventus in 2016.

Sekulov made his Serie C debut for Juventus U23 – the reserve team of Juventus – on 21 October 2020 in a 1–0 defeat to Pro Vercelli. On 22 September 2021, Sekulov scored his frist goal in his career in a 2–1 win against Triestina. On 17 October, Sekulov scored a brace in a 2–1 win against Seregno. On 29 October, Sekulov extended his contract with Juventus until 2025. 

On 7 December 2022, Sekulov scored Juventus Next Gen's 2–0 in their victory against Padova in Coppa Italia Serie C after carrying the ball from his own half.

International career 
Sekulov represented Macedonia internationally at youth level until the under-17s, switching allegiance to Italy in 2018. He represented the under-17s at the 2019 UEFA European Under-17 Championship, reaching the final of the competition where Italy lost to the Netherlands.

Style of play 
A half-winger, Sekulov has been likened to former Juventus midfielder Claudio Marchisio for his technical qualities, movements, and height.

Career statistics

Club

Honours 
Italy U17
 UEFA European Under-17 Championship runner-up: 2019

References

Notelist

External links 
 
 
 
 

2002 births
Living people
Sportspeople from Piacenza
Footballers from Emilia-Romagna
Italian footballers
Italy youth international footballers
Macedonian footballers
North Macedonia youth international footballers
Italian people of Macedonian descent
Association football midfielders
Piacenza Calcio 1919 players
Parma Calcio 1913 players
A.S. Pro Piacenza 1919 players
Juventus F.C. players
Serie C players
Juventus Next Gen players